Dian Kateliev (born 25 March 1980) is a Bulgarian footballer, who currently plays as a midfielder for Spartak Varna.

References

External links
 

1980 births
Living people
Bulgarian footballers
First Professional Football League (Bulgaria) players
Second Professional Football League (Bulgaria) players
PFC Spartak Varna players
PFC Kaliakra Kavarna players

Association football midfielders